Bavayia robusta , also known as the robust forest bavayia, is a species of geckos endemic to Grande Terre and Île des Pins in New Caledonia.

References

Bavayia
Reptiles described in 2000
Taxa named by Jennifer L. Wright
Taxa named by Aaron M. Bauer
Taxa named by Ross Allen Sadlier